Michael Thomas Hickland Wesley-Smith (born 2 December 1983) is a New Zealand television actor. He is best known for his portrayal of Jack in the teen sci-fi TV show The Tribe.

Biography
Wesley-Smith started his career acting on stage in productions such as Charlie and the Chocolate Factory or Hercules and starring in info-videos. In 1997, he landed a guest role on the TV series The Legend of William Tell. The production company of the show, Cloud 9, then asked him to audition for their new series, The Tribe. He won the part of Jack, and played him in all five seasons from 1999 to 2003. Throughout filming, he also occupied the lead role of the wacky teen comedy Atlantis High as Giles Gordon, and had to take several absences from The Tribe. His character Jack was therefore absent during long portions of the third and fourth seasons of the show. He also played the guest part of Craig in an episode of The Strip in 2002.

Wesley-Smith completed a degree in Law at Otago University and went on to study journalism at New Zealand Broadcasting School in Christchurch.

He now works as a reporter on Newshub's The Nation.

Filmography
The Last Great Snail Chase (2007)

TV work
 The Strip
 "Get Over It" (2002) .... Craig
 Atlantis High (2001) .... Giles Gordon
 The Tribe .... Jack (1999–2003, Seasons 1-5)
 The Legend of William Tell
 "The Challenge" (1998) .... Flynn

References

External links
 

1983 births
Living people
New Zealand male television actors
New Zealand journalists
New Zealand male child actors